Cloie Branch (sometimes referred to as Cloie Creek) is a  tributary of the Little Maquoketa River, rising in the northern part of the city of Asbury, in Dubuque County, Iowa.

Burgeoning suburban development in the city of Asbury has encroached the upper reaches of the system. The northern end of the system is rural. Asbury's sewer outfall drains into the creek and mechanical failures have in the past lead to the discharge of only partially treated sewage.

See also
List of rivers of Iowa

References

Environmental Protection Agency (retrieved 5 April 2007)
List of Dubuque County streams (retrieved 5 April 2007)
Eileen Mozinski, "Riniker: I was not notified of wastewater release", Dubuque, Iowa Telegraph Herald, 5 April 2007, p. 1 (online version, registration required)

Rivers of Iowa
Rivers of Dubuque County, Iowa